Cain at Abel is a 2018 Philippine television drama action series broadcast by GMA Network. Directed by Mark A. Reyes, it stars Dingdong Dantes and Dennis Trillo. It premiered on the network's Telebabad line up on November 19, 2018 to February 15, 2019, replacing Victor Magtanggol.

NUTAM (Nationwide Urban Television Audience Measurement) People in Television Homes ratings are provided by AGB Nielsen Philippines.

Series overview

Episodes

November 2018

December 2018

January 2019

February 2019

References

Lists of Philippine drama television series episodes